Robert's Quartet is a compact galaxy group approximately 160 million light-years away in the constellation Phoenix.  It is a family of four very different galaxies whose proximity to each other has caused the creation of about 200 star-forming regions and pulled out a stream of gas and dust 100,000 light years long.  Its members are NGC 87, NGC 88, NGC 89 and NGC 92, discovered by John Herschel on the 30 September 1834.

The quartet is one of the best examples of compact galaxy groups. Because such groups contain four to eight galaxies in a very small region they are excellent laboratories for the study of galactic interactions and their effects, in particular on the formation of stars. The quartet has a total visual magnitude of almost 13. The brightest member of the group is NGC 92, having the blue magnitude of 13.8.  On the sky, the four galaxies are all within a circle of radius of 1.6 arcmin, corresponding to about 75,000 light-years. It was named by  Halton Arp and Barry F. Madore, who compiled A Catalogue of Southern Peculiar Galaxies and Associations in 1987. Arp and Madore named Robert's Quartet after Robert Freedman who generated many of the updated positions of galaxies in the catalogue.

Members

See also
 Wild's Triplet
 Zwicky's Triplet
 Stephan's Quintet and NGC 7331 Group (Also known as the Deer Lick Group about half a degree northeast of Stephan's Quintet)
 Seyfert's Sextet
 Copeland Septet

References

External links
 ESo: Cosmic Portrait of a Perturbed Family
 "What's In A Name?"
 

 
Phoenix (constellation)
Galaxy clusters